Newhailes railway station, also known as Newhailes Junction, served the town of Musselburgh, East Lothian, Scotland from 1847 to 1950.

History 
The station opened sometime after the opening of the Musselburgh branch in 1847. it closed on 6 February 1950.

References

External links 

1847 establishments in Scotland
1950 disestablishments in Scotland
Former North British Railway stations
Railway stations in Great Britain opened in 1847
Railway stations in Great Britain closed in 1950
Disused railway stations in East Lothian